59th Street station may refer to:

59th Street (BMT Fourth Avenue Line) in Brooklyn, New York; serving the  trains
59th Street (IRT Third Avenue Line) a demolished elevated station in Manhattan
59th Street (IRT Ninth Avenue Line) a demolished elevated station in Manhattan
59th Street station (New York Central Railroad), a disused railway station in the Park Avenue Tunnel, New York City
59th Street station (Sacramento), a light rail station in Sacramento, California
59th Street/University of Chicago station, a commuter rail station in Chicago, Illinois
59th Street–Columbus Circle (New York City Subway), a subway station complex in Manhattan, New York consisting of:
59th Street–Columbus Circle (IND Eighth Avenue Line); serving the  trains
59th Street–Columbus Circle (IRT Broadway–Seventh Avenue Line); serving the  trains
Fifth Avenue–59th Street (BMT Broadway Line) in Manhattan, New York; serving the  trains
Lexington Avenue/59th Street (New York City Subway), a subway station complex in Manhattan, New York consisting of:
Lexington Avenue/59th Street (BMT Broadway Line); serving the  trains
59th Street (IRT Lexington Avenue Line); serving the  trains

See also 
 59th Street (Manhattan)